Chants R&B (originally known as Chants) were a rhythm and blues band from Christchurch, New Zealand, and are considered one best examples of garage rhythm and blues from Australasia during the 1960s. They won the Battle Of The Bands contest at Addington Showgrounds in 1964. Their line-up was: 
Trevor Courtney on drums
Michael Rudd on rhythm guitar and vocals
Pete Hansen on bass
Jim Tomlin lead guitar

In 1966 the position of lead guitarist was taken by Max Kelly, a deserter from the Australian Air Force. When he had to return to Australia for desertion charges, the band followed with him. By this time they had a bassist by the name of Neil Young - no relation to the well-known Canadian musician of the same name.

The band was successful in Melbourne but they could not decide whether to exclusively play soul music (very popular in Melbourne at the time mainly through a TV show called "Kommotion" which had the highly influential Ian "Molly" Meldrum as a so-host) or blues (which became popular in Australia in the 1970s) and parted ways in 1967.

Influences
Their sound was heavily based on the Rolling Stones, Them, Otis Redding, the Pretty Things and the Yardbirds.

Reformation
They reformed in 2007, and played in Christchurch & Auckland.
Mike Rudd had a very successful career with several bands (see Mike Rudd)

Discography

Singles

References

Further reading
 Chants R&B official site
 Chants R&B history at Mike Rudd's website

New Zealand rhythm and blues musical groups